William Walter "Peek-A-Boo" Veach (June 15, 1862 – November 12, 1937) was an American Major League Baseball player born in Indianapolis, Indiana. Veach began his career with the ill-fated Union Association in  when he joined the Kansas City Cowboys as a pitcher/outfielder. As a pitcher he started and completed all 12 games in which he pitched, resulting in a 3 win and 9 loss record. Three years later he pitched just one game for the  Louisville Colonels, a complete game loss. As a batter, he had career total that included a .215 batting average and three home runs.

Veach acquired his nickname when playing for Kansas City in 1884.  It was during this season that his manager Ted Sullivan had set up timing plays to pick runners off first base through the use of signals that Veach would have to wait and look for.  Players had caught on to this trick and began calling him Peek-A-Boo because he would be looking around for signals.  He was a veteran of the Spanish–American War, so near the end of his life he was admitted into the United States Hospital in Indianapolis.  It was here that he died at the age of 75, and is interred at Floral Park Cemetery.

References

External links

1862 births
1937 deaths
American military personnel of the Spanish–American War
19th-century baseball players
Baseball players from Indianapolis
Major League Baseball pitchers
Major League Baseball first basemen
Kansas City Cowboys (UA) players
Louisville Colonels players
Cleveland Spiders players
Pittsburgh Alleghenys players
Evansville (minor league baseball) players
Macon (minor league baseball) players
Toronto Canucks players
Memphis Browns players
Des Moines Hawkeyes players
St. Paul Apostles players
Sioux City Corn Huskers players
Sacramento Altas players
Oakland Colonels players
San Francisco Haverlys players
Chattanooga Chatts players
Macon Central City players
Quincy Ravens players
Quincy Browns players
St. Joseph Saints players
Minneapolis Millers (baseball) players
American expatriate baseball players in Canada